Austria competed at the 2016 Winter Youth Olympics in Lillehammer, Norway from 12 to 21 February 2016.

Medalists

Alpine skiing

Boys

Girls

Parallel mixed team

Biathlon

Boys

Girls

Mixed

Bobsleigh

Cross-country skiing

Boys

Girls

Freestyle skiing

Halfpipe

Ski cross

Slopestyle

Ice hockey

Luge

Individual sleds

Mixed team relay

Nordic combined 

Individual

Nordic mixed team

Skeleton

Ski jumping 

Individual

Team

Snowboarding

Halfpipe

Snowboard cross

Slopestyle

Snowboard and ski cross relay

Qualification legend: FA – Qualify to medal round; FB – Qualify to consolation round

Speed skating

Boys

Girls

Mixed team sprint

See also
Austria at the 2016 Summer Olympics

References

2016 in Austrian sport
Nations at the 2016 Winter Youth Olympics
Austria at the Youth Olympics